The New Bern Bears were a minor league baseball team based in New Bern, North Carolina. Between 1937 and 1952, with a break during World War II, the Bears teams played as exclusively as members of the Coastal Plain League, winning three league championships. New Bern hosted minor league home games at Kafer Park.

History
The New Bern Bears were preceded in minor league baseball by the 1908 New Bern team, who played briefly as members of the Eastern Carolina League before folding during the season.

1937 to 1941

The New Bern "Bears" began play in 1937. The Bears would remain for every season of the Class D level Coastal Plain League, winning three championships.

The New Bern use of the "Bears" nickname corresponds to local history. When the city of New Bern was founded in 1710, early settlers adopted the Bear as the city mascot after a bear was the first animal the group encountered. Today, there are more than 50 bear statues throughout the city, with Bear Plaza being a focal point in downtown New Bern.

In 1937, New Bern was joined by the Ayden Aces, Goldsboro Goldbugs, Greenville Greenies, Kinston Eagles, Snow Hill Billies, Tarboro Serpents and Williamston Martins as charter franchises in the Coastal State League, beginning league play on May 6, 1937.

In their first season of Coastal Plain League play, the New Bern Bears ended the regular season with a record of 48–45, placing 4th in the eight–team league standings. Their manager in 1937 was Doc Smith, who led the team to the four–team playoffs. In the 1st round of the playoffs, the Snow Hill Hill Billies defeated New Bern 3 games to 1 to end their season.

Under returning manager Doc Smith, the New Bern Bears won the 1938 Coastal Plain League championship, their first of three league titles. The Bears ended the regular season with a record of 63–49, winning the league pennant in placing 1st in the Coastal Plain League regular season. In the playoffs, New Bern swept both playoff series in defeating the Kinston Eagles 4 games to 0 in the 1st round and the Snow Hill Billies 4 games to 0 in the finals.

In 1939, the New Bern Bears missed qualifying for the Coastal Plain League playoffs. With a record of 62–59, New Bern placed 5th in the Coastal Plain League regular season standings, playing under manager Doc Smith.
 
The 1940 New Bern Bears finished the regular season with a record of 58–67. New Bern placed 6th in the Coastal Plain League standings, playing the season under managers Guy Shatzer and Gene McCarty. The Bears did not qualify for the 1940 Coastal Plain League playoffs.

The New Bern Bears League advanced to the 1941 Coastal Plain League playoffs, before the league was paused during World War II. The Bears finished with a regular season record of 61–57, placing 3rd in the regular season under returning manager Doc Smith and another manager in Jake Wade. In the 1941 Coastal Plain League Playoffs, the Greenville Greenies defeated New Bern 4 games to 2.

1946 to 1952

The 1946 New Bern Bears returned to play after the Coastal Plain League was idle in the 1942–1945 seasons due to World War II. The Bears ended the regular season with a 57–86 record, placing 7th in the eight–team league standings and missing the playoffs. The 1946 manager was Abe White.

The New Bern Bears placed 4th in the 1947 Coastal Plain League standings. The Bears' regular season record of 73–66 advanced the team to the Coastal Plain League playoffs, playing under managers Jake Daniel, Harry Soufas, Tom Murray and Worlise Knowles. In the playoffs, the Wilson Tobs defeated New Bern 4 games to 1.

The 1948 New Bern Bears did not qualify for the Coastal Plain League playoffs. The Bears placed 5th and finished the regular season with a 69–70 record. The team was managed by Harry Soufas, Tal Abernathy and Winston Palmer.

The 1949 New Bern Bears returned to the Coastal Plain League playoffs. The Bears finished the regular season with a 73–66 record, placing 3rd in the Coastal Plain League under manager Bull Hamons. In the 1st round of the 1949 Coastal Plain League playoffs, New Bern was defeated by the Kinston Eagles 4 games 2.
 
The New Bern Bears won their first of consecutive Coastal Plain League Championships in 1950. With a Coastal Plain League regular season record of 71–67, the Bears placed 3rd in the Coastal Plain League final standings, playing under manager Harry Land. In the playoffs,  New Bern defeated the Rocky Mount Leafs 4 games to 2 to advance, before sweeping the Kinston Eagles in 4 games to claim the championship.

New Bern won their second consecutive Coastal Plain League championship in 1951. The Bears ended the regular season in 2nd place, with a 72–54 record, playing the season under returning manager Harry Land. In the playoffs, New Bern defeated the Goldsboro Cardinals 4 games to 2 to advance. In the Finals, the Bears defeated the Wilson Tobs 4 games to 3 to win the league championship.

In the final season of the Coastal Plain League, the 1952 New Bern Bears finished last in the standings. The Bears placed 8th with a 40–83 record and were managed by Larry Dempsey, John Pavlich and Steve Collins. The Coastal League permanently folded as a minor league following the 1952 season.

New Bern has not hosted another minor league team.

The ballpark
The New Bern Bears hosted minor league home games games at Kafer Park. Today, the baseball field is still in use. Kafer Park is located at 603 George Street, New Bern, North Carolina.

Timeline

Year–by–year records

Notable alumni

Tal Abernathy (1948, MGR)
Alf Anderson (1938)
Les Burge (1938)
Steve Collins (1952, MGR)
Jake Daniel (1947, MGR), (1949)
Al Evans (1937)
Stu Flythe (1937)
Ken Guettler (1946)
Phil McCullough (1939)
Bunky Stewart (1951)
Ben Wade (1940)
Jake Wade (1941, MGR)
Abe White (1946, MGR)

See also
New Bern Bears players

References

External links
New Bern - Baseball Reference

Defunct minor league baseball teams
Baseball teams disestablished in 1952
Baseball teams established in 1937
Defunct baseball teams in North Carolina
Coastal Plain League (minor league) teams
New Bern, North Carolina